Lingfeng Temple is a Buddhist temple located in Taihuai Town of Wutai County, Xinzhou, Shanxi, China.

History
The Lingfeng temple was first established in the Tang dynasty (618-907), rebuilt in the Chenghua period (1447-1487) of Ming dynasty (1368-1644), the modern temple was founded in 1998. In 1975, Lingfeng Temple was demolished due to the temple had fallen into a great state of disrepair.

Architecture

Paifang
A paifang built of white marble in the front of the temple.

Stupa
A stupa is the oldest architecture in the temple. The stupa was octagonal with five stories. The sumeru throne engraved patterns of Eight Heavenly Kings (Eight Diamond Kings). On the second floor, each side is carved with three Buddha statues. On the third floor, each side is carved with a Buddha statue. On the first floor, it is engraved with the words: "".

Gallery

References

Buddhist temples in Xinzhou
Wutai County
Xinzhou